Lloyd Winnecke (born June 6, 1960) is an American politician and businessman serving as the 34th mayor of Evansville, Indiana. He was elected in November 2011 and his four-year term began January 1, 2012. In November 2015, Winnecke was re-elected for a second term, and, in November 2019, he was elected to a third term.

Winnecke formerly served as news director for WEHT-TV News 25 in Henderson, Kentucky. He also served as president of the Vanderburgh County Commission and was senior vice president and marketing director for Fifth Third Bank.

Early life and education
Lloyd Winnecke was born in Evansville to Ralph and Shirley Winnecke, who were lab technicians at Mead Johnson. Winnecke graduated from Central High School in 1978 and attended the University of Evansville where he received a Bachelor's degree in communications.

Career

Fifth Third Bank and news broadcasting
For thirteen years prior to running for mayor, he worked as senior vice president and marketing director for Fifth Third Bank. Prior to joining the bank, Lloyd spent 17 years in television news, most recently as News Director at WEHT News 25.

County government
Winnecke has held office continuously since shortly after the 1999 city campaign, when he was selected in a GOP caucus to succeed then-newly elected Mayor Russ Lloyd Jr., on the Vanderburgh County Council. In 2002, in a County Council re-election campaign, Winnecke defeated Democrat Chris Walsh by 61-39 percent. Winnecke had a GOP primary opponent in his 2006 council campaign but no Democratic opponent. As a county councilman, he spent three years as president and one year as finance chairman.

In 2008 Winnecke sought a County Commissioners seat and was unopposed. He went on to serve as President of that body. As a county official on both the council and the commissioners he balanced budgets for 11 straight years and held per capita spending to 43% below the state average.

Mayor of Evansville
Winnecke's first term as Evansville mayor began on January 1, 2012. He is only the third Republican to head the City of Evansville since 1955. In his first year in office he fought for, and secured, a state-funded full cloverleaf at one of the city's busiest intersections at the Lloyd Expressway and U.S. Route 41.

Winnecke sought to improve city hall's responsiveness through the use of a smartphone app that gives Evansville residents a way to report non-emergency issues to city government.

In an effort to boost downtown development and conventions Winnecke spearheaded a number of related projects. He successfully championed a downtown location for a new interdisciplinary academic health science education and research campus affiliated with the Indiana University School of Medicine - Evansville. In 2013 he also proposed a new 253 room convention hotel adjacent to the Ford Center and Old National Events Plaza. The project included a $7 million subsidy for the hotel and an additional $13 million in public funds for a new parking garage, bridges connecting the hotel, Old National Events Plaza and the Ford Center, and improvements to the Events Plaza. However, in December 2014 Old National withdrew from the project and it was delayed until a revised plan with 240 rooms was approved in 2015.

Winnecke opposed the state's proposed constitutional ban on same-sex marriage and expressed concern over Indiana Senate Bill 101, also known as the Indiana "religious objections" bill, as sending the "wrong message" about the state.
On January 9, 2019, Winnecke filed for re-election to seek a third term as mayor.

Personal life 
Winnecke resides in downtown Evansville, Indiana. He is married to Carolyn McClintock and has a daughter, Danielle. Winnecke is a Roman Catholic and attends St. Mary's Catholic Church.

Electoral history

2011

2015

2019

References

1960 births
Indiana Republicans
Living people
Mayors of Evansville, Indiana
Politicians from Evansville, Indiana
21st-century American politicians